The Prohibition of Female Genital Mutilation (Scotland) Act 2005 (asp 8) is an Act of the Scottish Parliament. It extended previous legislation by also making it illegal for UK nationals to perform female genital mutilation outside the borders of the UK. There have been no known cases of girls from Scotland being sent abroad for the procedure. The Act also increased the maximum penalty from five to 14 years.

It replaced the Prohibition of Female Circumcision Act 1985. The corresponding legislation for the rest of the United Kingdom is the Female Genital Mutilation Act 2003.

Female Genital Mutilation (FGM) has
been illegal in the United Kingdom since 1985 when the Prohibition of Female
Circumcision Act 1985 was passed in Scotland. The rest of the United Kingdom
quickly followed suit with each country creating its own version of the law. Over
the decades that this law was in place, no conviction could be mounted as the law
itself was too vague to be enforced properly. In order to protect the women of
the British Isles the Prohibition of Female Circumcision Act 1985 was replied and
replaced in 2003 when the United Kingdom passed the stricter Female Genital
Mutilation Act 2003 and Scotland’s corresponding Prohibition of Female Genital
Mutilation (Scotland) Act 2005.

The Scottish Prohibition of Female
Genital Mutilation (Scotland) Act 2005 strengthens the original Prohibition of
Female Circumcision Act 1985 by defining Female genital mutilation in multiple
forms.  Female genital mutilation (FGM)
is defined in section 1 of the act is "to excise, infibulate or otherwise
mutilate the whole or any part of the labia majora, labia minora, prepuce of
the clitoris, clitoris or vagina of another person". While this was useful
to draw convictions originally, the wording inadvertently also prohibited doctors
and other people in the medical professions from giving several types of operations
that may be necessary during and after child birth. The law was soon revised to
say that no crime may be committed by an approved individual if the operation
or procedure on another person is necessary for their physical or mental health;
or if the surgical operation in question takes place during any stage of labor,
or child birth, or if the operation takes place immediately after child birth
for a purpose connected with said child birth or labor.

The Scottish Prohibition of Female
Genital Mutilation (Scotland) Act 2005 continues to surpass the original Prohibition
of Female Circumcision Act 1985 in preventing mutilation on a further level by adding
the "Aiding and abetting female genital mutilation" clause to the act.  The Aiding and abetting clause as well as
related article define aiding and abetting as "To plan, help, assist,
brainwash, intimidate, persuade, encourage or to be involved in any way in
circumcising any girl or woman. This includes fathers and grandfathers who
demand that their daughter or granddaughter is circumcised, even if they do not
arrange the ritual to be involved in any way in getting any woman or girl to
circumcise herself." The clause was crucial in the process of mounting
convictions for female genital mutilation as the original Prohibition of Female
Circumcision Act 1985 only prohibited the actual act of the mutilation by
whoever commits the procedure, but not the people who would arrange the
procedure or those who convinced the woman in question to have her genitals
mutilated.

Mutilation (Scotland) Act was further strengthened the Prohibition of Female
Circumcision Act 1985, by outlining the punishments for committing Female genital
mutilation of aiding and abetting female genital mutilation. Anyone convicted of
Female genital mutilation or related offenses will be jailed for up to 14 years
as well as a non-disclosed fine, and have their children sent to live with
relatives. If the convicted does not have a visa or necessary documentation to
remain in Britain, the convict in question as well as their immediate family
will be deported to their country of origin and punished to the full extent of
the law, as well as the possibility of being banned from working with children
or returning to Britain. If the woman who has been mutilated is under the age
of 17, she may be removed from the custody of her parents and be given medical
treatment, while her parents or Care takers will be given strict conditions that
they must comply with for the girl in question's health and protection. Furthermore
any United Kingdom national or United Kingdom resident found attempting to
leave the United Kingdom for the purpose of female genital mutilation will be
treated as thought the offence was committed in Scotland, regardless of the
actual location or destination.

There was controversy over the Prohibition of Female Genital Mutilation Act (Scotland) 2005, as some claim the law discriminated against African immigrants; to which the Scottish government
responded "This new law applies to everyone in Scotland, no matter where they
are from. Many communities which circumcise girls are African, but female
circumcision also happens in other countries, including in some parts of the
Middle East, India, Sri Lanka and Australia."

References

External links

Acts of the Scottish Parliament 2005
Female genital mutilation in the United Kingdom
Scottish criminal law
Women's rights in Scotland
2005 in women's history